Sophia Aggelonitis (born ) is a Canadian businesswoman and former politician. She was a Liberal member of the Legislative Assembly of Ontario who represented the riding of Hamilton Mountain from 2007 to 2011. She served as the province's Minister of Revenue and Minister Responsible for Seniors in the Liberal government of Premier Dalton McGuinty.

Background
Agglenotis was born in Toronto and raised in Welland, Ontario.  She is the daughter of Greek immigrants who came from Sparta, Greece in the 1960s. She went to school at Eastdale High School and Brock University where she obtained a degree in politics and psychology. She has worked as a consultant specializing in special events and environmental auditing. Her most recent venture was one called "Sauces by Sophia" selling a brand of tzatziki to supermarkets and specialty food stores in Southern Ontario. In March 2007 she became president of the Hamilton Chamber of Commerce. However, she resigned three months later to pursue the Liberal nomination after Marie Bountrogianni announced that she would not seek another term in office.

Politics
Aggelonitis ran as the Liberal candidate in the 2007 provincial election, defeating the NDP candidate by 2,334 votes. Following the election she was appointed Parliamentary Assistant to Harinder Takhar, the Minister of Small Business and Entrepreneurship.

She later served as Parliamentary Assistant to Ted McMeekin, Minister of Consumer Services, and Sandra Pupatello, Minister of Economic Development and Trade. She was also named chair of the Small Business Agency of Ontario to encourage better communication between government and small business.

In 2009, Aggelonitis introduced a private member's bill called An Act to proclaim Mental Health Awareness Day, calling for the last day of Mental Health Week each year to be proclaimed Mental Health Awareness Day.

On January 18, 2010, Aggelonitis was named Minister of Consumer Services. On August 18, 2010, she was named Minister of Revenue and Minister Responsible for Seniors. In those capacities she presided over legislation to combat contraband tobacco and the implementation of stronger protections for retirement home residents.

She ran for re-election in the 2011 provincial election, but was defeated by New Democrat Monique Taylor by 5,798 votes.

Cabinet posts

Electoral record

After politics
In September 2012, Aggelonitis was named as president of the Ontario Liberal Fund, a body that will co-ordinate fundraising activities for the party on the province. She also serves as a judge on a local entrepreneurship contest called the "Lion's Lair" which awards cash and business resources to the winners of the contest.

References

Notes

Citations

External links

1968 births
Women government ministers of Canada
Living people
Ontario Liberal Party MPPs
Businesspeople from Toronto
Canadian people of Greek descent
Women MPPs in Ontario
Canadian women in business
Members of the Executive Council of Ontario
Politicians from Hamilton, Ontario
Politicians from Toronto
Canadian women company founders
Brock University alumni
21st-century Canadian politicians
21st-century Canadian women politicians